Barium chlorate, Ba(ClO3)2, is the barium salt of chloric acid. It is a white crystalline solid, and like all soluble barium compounds, irritant and toxic. It is sometimes used in pyrotechnics to produce a green color. It also finds use in the production of chloric acid.

Reactions

Synthesis

Barium chlorate can be produced through a double replacement reaction between solutions of barium chloride and sodium chlorate:

BaCl2 + 2 NaClO3 → Ba(ClO3)2 + 2 NaCl

On concentrating and chilling the resulting mixture, barium chlorate precipitates. This is perhaps the most common preparation, exploiting the lower solubility of barium chlorate compared to sodium chlorate.

The above method does result in some sodium contamination, which is undesirable for pyrotechnic purposes, where the strong yellow of sodium can easily overpower the green of barium. Sodium-free barium chlorate can be produced directly through electrolysis:

BaCl2 + 6 H2O →  Ba(ClO3)2 + 6 H2

It can also be produced by the reaction of barium carbonate with boiling ammonium chlorate solution:

2 NH4ClO3 + BaCO3 + Q → Ba(ClO3)2 + 2 NH3 + H2O + CO2

The reaction initially produces barium chlorate and ammonium carbonate; boiling the solution decomposes the ammonium carbonate and drives off the resulting ammonia and carbon dioxide, leaving only barium chlorate in solution.

Decomposition

When exposed to heat, barium chlorate alone will decompose to barium chloride and oxygen:

Ba(ClO3)2 → BaCl2 + 3 O2

Chloric acid

Barium chlorate is used to produce chloric acid, the formal precursor to all chlorate salts, through its reaction with dilute sulfuric acid, which results in a solution of chloric acid and insoluble barium sulfate precipitate:

Ba(ClO3)2 + H2SO4 → 2 HClO3 + BaSO4

Both the chlorate and the acid should be prepared as dilute solutions before mixing, such that the chloric acid produced is dilute, as concentrated solutions of chloric acid (above 30%) are unstable and prone to decompose, sometimes explosively.

Commercial uses

Barium chlorate, when burned with a fuel, produces a vibrant green light. Because it is an oxidizer, a chlorine donor, and contains a metal, this compound produces a green color that is unparalleled. However, due to the instability of all chlorates to sulfur, acids, and ammonium ions, chlorates have been banned from use in class C fireworks in the United States. Therefore, more and more firework producers have begun to use more stable compound such as barium nitrate and barium carbonate.

Environmental Hazard
Barium chlorate is toxic to humans and can also harm the environment. It is very harmful to aquatic organisms if it is leached into bodies of water. Chemical spills of this compound, although not common, can harm entire ecosystems and should be prevented. It is necessary to dispose of this compound as hazardous waste. The Environmental Protection Agency (EPA) lists barium chlorate as hazardous.

References

Barium compounds
Inorganic compounds
Chlorates
Pyrotechnic oxidizers
Pyrotechnic colorants
Oxidizing agents